Duchess Marie may refer to:

 Marie, Duchess of Anhalt
 Duchess Marie d'Orleans-Longueville de Nemours (1625–1707), daughter of Henry II of Orleans, duke of Longueville
 Duchess Marie Louise of Parma (1791–1847), Archduchess of Austria
 Duchess Marie of Auvergne (1367–1434), daughter of John, Duke of Berry
 Duchess Marie of Mecklenburg (1878–1918), eldest daughter of Adolf Friedrich V, Grand Duke of Mecklenburg-Strelitz and Princess Elisabeth of Anhalt
 Duchess Marie of Mecklenburg-Schwerin (1854–1920), daughter of Frederick Francis II, Grand Duke of Mecklenburg-Schwerin and Princess Auguste Mathilde Wilhelmine of Reuss 
 Duchess Marie Elisabeth of Saxony
 Duchess Marie Gabrielle in Bavaria

See also

 Archduchess Marie (disambiguation)
 Duchess Maria (disambiguation)
 Duchess Mary (disambiguation)